Don't Stop is the tenth studio album by the French band Rockets.
The album, however, includes 4 old hits remixes, and the title track is inspired by a 1982 song which was supposed to be included on the album Atomic, but eventually discarded.

Track listing 
 "Don't Stop"
 "Rockets Land"
 "One Day"
 "On the Road Again"
 "Communication"
 "Electric Delight"
 "Endless Blue"
 "Galactica"
 "Astral World"
 "Moon Walk"

Personnel

Rockets
Luca "L.B.M." Bestetti - vocals (1, 2, 7, 10), production (5, 10)
Fabrice Quagliotti - keyboards, synth, production, vocals (5, 7)
Little B. - drums (1, 2), percussion (6)

Additional musicians
Christian Le Bartz - vocals (4, 6, 8, 9)
Matt Rossato - electric acoustic guitar (1, 5)
Pino Di Pietro - guitars (4, 8, keyboards (1, 4, 7, 8)
Alessandro Granata - keyboards (1, 3)
Alain Groetzinger - artistic contribution (1)
Sebastian Mauro - electronic drums (7), bass (7), engineering (1, 7)
Joe T. Vannelli - drums (2, 3, 7), bass (2, 4, 7, 8), keyboards (2), groove percussions (4, 8), production, mixing
Andrea Bertolini - drums (2, bass (2, 4, 8), keyboards (2), groove percussions (4, 8), engineering (1, 2, 4, 8), mixing (1-4, 6-8)
Gianni Nuzzi - synth (2, 10), programming (2, 10), computer drums machine programming (5), sequencer (2, 5, 10)
Anna Venturas - lyric voice (3, 7)
Silvano Del Gado - live percussions (4, 8)
Louis K - mixing (9)

References

2003 albums
Rockets (band) albums